Coshocton may refer to:
 Coshocton, Ohio
 Coshocton High School
 Coshocton County, Ohio
 Cohocton, New York